The 2024 United States presidential election in South Dakota is scheduled to take place on Tuesday, November 5, 2024, as part of the 2024 United States elections in which all 50 states plus the District of Columbia will participate. South Dakota voters will choose electors to represent them in the Electoral College via a popular vote. The state of South Dakota has three electoral votes in the Electoral College, following reapportionment due to the 2020 United States census in which the state neither gained nor lost a seat.

Incumbent Democratic president Joe Biden has stated that he intends to run for reelection to a second term.

Republican primary

Republican primary

The South Dakota Republican primary is scheduled to be held on June 4, 2024, alongside primaries in the District of Columbia, Montana, New Jersey, and New Mexico.

General election

Polling
Donald Trump vs. Joe Biden

See also 
 United States presidential elections in South Dakota
 2024 United States presidential election
 2024 Democratic Party presidential primaries
 2024 Republican Party presidential primaries
 2024 United States elections

Notes

Partisan clients

References 

South Dakota
2024
United States presidential